Divided into three houses, the Kunstmuseen Krefeld (Art museums Krefeld) are dedicated in particular to modern and contemporary art. Thanks to the early and consistent orientation, especially under the director , an international reputation has been built up since the late 1950s. In addition to the construction of the Kaiser Wilhelm Museum on Joseph-Beuys-Platz as the main building, the museum has presentation venues for special exhibitions in the villa ensemble Haus Lange and Haus Esters on Wilhelmshofallee. Since 1 September 2016, the museums have been headed by Katia Baudin, former deputy director of the Museum Ludwig in Cologne.

History

Beginning 
In January 1882, the Craftsmen's and Education Association stated in a citizens' meeting: "It is desirable that a museum be established in Crefeld that represents the interests of the arts and crafts in particular". A museum commission was then founded, and the following year a museum association. This then had 32 members, including the mayor, the district administrator, the school board and several silk manufacturers. In the same year, the first exhibition Kunstwerke aus Krefelder Privatbesitz was held in the Stadthalle. In the 1880s, the museum association primarily sought donations, objects and paintings as the basis for a museum building. In 1884, the city of Krefeld made the former school at Westwall 60 available free of charge. As early as 1897, the total value of the collection was estimated at 112,000 Reichsmark. This included a Roman department, ironware from the 15th to the 18th century, Italian metalwork, furniture from the Lower Rhine, Rhenish stoneware, pottery, German and Dutch faiences, South German and French furniture of the Rococo and the Empire, Italian furniture of the Renaissance and a painting gallery.

The Museum at Karlsplatz 

After the death of Kaiser William I in 1888, the idea was taken up to erect a museum as a memorial to the late emperor instead of a monument. Finally, the Kaiser Wilhelm Museum was built between 1894 and 1897 and extended by north and south wings as early as 1910–1912. The foundation of the new museum was the collection of Konrad Kramer from Kempen, who had been Lower Rhine region since 1850 furniture, sculptures, stained glass, stoneware, paintings and weapons. The Krefeld city councillor Albert Oetker had bought the Kramer collection in time for the opening of the museum and brought it in as a donation.

The first director of the museum was Friedrich Deneken in 1897. During his 25-year tenure, the collection was developed. In an appeal, he wrote: "The Kaiser Wilhelm Museum must preferably be directed towards the acquisition of newer art products". For example, as early as 1900, 26 purchases laid the foundation for today's important poster collection.

In 1922, Max Creutz succeeded Deneken as museum director. While Deneken's focus had been on modern decorative arts and small-scale art, Creutz shifted it to contemporary fine arts. Furthermore, paintings by Campendonk, Liebermann and Kirchner were purchased. In 1923, Creutz arranged for the creation of four large murals Lebensalter by Johan Thorn Prikker on the upper floor.

Creutze's death in 1932 marked the beginning of a period of stagnation at the museum. Burghardt Freiherr von Lepel took over as director in 1933, but left again in 1936. Fritz Muthmann's term of office from 1937 to 1943 saw the confiscation of so-called Degenerate Art, and thus almost the entire stock of modern works of art built up by Max Creutz. Muthmann had the Prikker murals bricked up and thus saved them from destruction. The many purchases made during his tenure were reversed after the war by the victorious powers.

The museum, which was closed in 1942, survived the war unscathed and was initially shared by municipal offices and institutions.

The post-war years 
In 1947, Paul Wember was appointed museum director. With the limited funds at his disposal, Wember attempted to purchase works of art from the 1930s after the currency reform in 1948 in order to expand and round off existing focal points of the collection. But also Romantic drawings or Impressionist paintings were purchased to complete the collection. In 1953 and 1954, sheets by Max Ernst, Yves Tanguy, Joan Miró, Matisse and Picasso, among others, could be acquired at favourable prices, and thus the importance of contemporary graphic art increased within the collections. In 1955, Ulrich Lange made his childhood home, built between 1928 and 1930 by Ludwig Mies van der Rohe, available to the city of Krefeld for ten years as an exhibition venue for contemporary art. Under Wember's management, Haus Lange became one of the leading exhibition venues for avant-garde art, and it was here that Yves Klein held his first and last museum retrospective during his lifetime.

With a minimal acquisition budget, the Krefeld museum was not in a position to invest in classical modernism like the big houses. Wember therefore bought unknown contemporary art, including works by Yves Klein, Tàpies and Beuys, for example a first painting by Yves Klein in 1959 for DM 500 or two paintings by Piero Manzoni for 200 DM. Wember used a wide range of contacts with gallery owners such as Michael Hertz, Alfred Schmela, Rolf Ricke, Rudolf Zwirner and Conny Fischer for exhibitions and purchases.

In 1960, the Kaiser Wilhelm Museum closed for an urgently needed general renovation, which, however, was to begin in 1966. With the expiry of the 10 years, exhibition activities in Haus Lange also ended for the time being in 1966, thus closing both museums.

Since 1969 
In April 1969, the Kaiser Wilhelm Museum was reopened. Also, by Ulrich Lange Haus Lange was donated to the city with the condition to show exhibitions of contemporary art here for 99 years. In 1975 Wember retired. In 1976, the city of Krefeld was able to acquire Haus Esters, the neighbouring house of Haus Lange, which opened in 1981 as another exhibition institute for temporary exhibitions of contemporary art.

In 2010, the Kaiser Wilhelm Museum closed once again for a fundamental renovation, which was carried out from 2012. With the completion of the work, the first collection presentation Das Abenteuer unserer Sammlung I was opened on 2 June 2016, thus presenting many works to the public for the first time in over six years.

Buildings

Kaiser-Wilhelm-Museum 
The museum building was built in 1894–1897 in the style of eclecticism and extended in 1910–1912 with north and south wings. The building remained undamaged in the Second World War and was rebuilt in 1966–1969. The removal of the grand staircase and the emperor's statue increased the exhibition space by almost 40%.

Between 2012 and 2016, the house was renovated once again and equipped according to international museum standards for climate and safety. In the process, the mural Lebensalter by Jan Thorn Prikker, created in 1923, was made visible again.

Haus Lange / Haus Esters 

In 1927, Hermann Lange, art collector and director of the Vereinigte Seidenwebereien (VerSeidAG), together with Josef Esters, also director of the VerSeidAG, commissioned the architect Ludwig Mies van der Rohe to design the homes for both families. In the same year, Mies van der Rohe had already realised the furnishing of the Café Samt und Seide at the Berlin trade fair Die Mode der Dame with his then partner Lilly Reich on behalf of the Association of German Silk Weavers with headquarters in Krefeld.

The two-storey villas, built between 1928 and 1931 in the style of classical modernism, extend into the site as flat structures consisting of nested cubes and dominant rows of windows. All the south-facing windows of the house are designed as undivided glass surfaces that can be recessed into the ground except for a low parapet height. This allows the separation between interior and exterior space to be temporarily eliminated. On the street side, however, the buildings appear relatively closed and compact. Inside, the room segments interlock.

Mies van der Rohe also designed the gardens for Haus Esters, and presumably also for Haus Lange because of the similarity. The result was landscaped areas with wide lawns, straight paths and flowerbeds whose geometry follows the formal language of the buildings.

Collection 
The collection of the Kunstmuseen Krefeld comprises approx. 14,000 works from the fields of painting, sculpture, graphic art, applied art, photography and new media.

Art before 1945 
The older works in the museum are very much influenced by the history of the museum's origins. Especially many donations and endowments from the early days form the foundation. The aforementioned Oetker Collection is particularly worthy of mention here, as well as the Kramer Collection with medieval sculptures from the Lower Rhine. As mentioned, the former Beckerath Collection forms a closed complex of Italian Renaissance art with, among other things, several high-quality sculptural works of the Quattrocento.

One focus is on paintings from the 19th century, including works by Franz von Lenbach, Wilhelm Leibl, Johann Wilhelm Schirmer, Hans Thoma and various artists of the Düsseldorf School of Painting.

Classical Modernism is represented, among others, by the marble sculpture Eva (1900) by Auguste Rodin and the painting The Houses of Parliament in London (1904) by Claude Monet. The Modern Collection was torn apart in 1937 by the confiscations in the context of degenerate art. Heinrich Campendonk's Pierrot with Sunflower (1925) and the painting Kuhmelken (1913) by Emil Nolde returned to the collection after the war. Some gaps were closed again after 1945 through targeted acquisitions. The museum has works by the German Impressionists Max Slevogt, Lois Corinth and Max Liebermann as well as Expressionist works. The Painting Flood (1912) by Wassily Kandinsky Symphony Black and Red by Alexej von Jawlensky and a group of works by Heinrich Campendonk represent the Blaue Reiter. Of particular note are the Constructivist works by Piet Mondrian, whose rightful ownership has been under discussion for some time, Theo van Doesburg and László Moholy-Nagy.

Art after 1945 
The collection boasts many new realists. Jean Tinguely, Arman, Raymond Hains, Jacques de la Villeglé and others enrich the collection, as do Yaakov Agam, Lucio Fontana, Piero Manzoni, Jesús Rafael Soto or Heinz Mack, Otto Piene and Günther Uecker. The house has a special history with Yves Klein, who held his first and only retrospective in Haus Lange. Due to the large number of works, Klein, along with Joseph Beuys, forms a central artistic position that continues to shape the collection today. From the field of Pop Art, the museum can boast works by artists such as Robert Rauschenberg, Robert Indiana and Andy Warhol. In the 1980s, there was a turn to European positions, especially to artists of the Kunstakademie Düsseldorf, including paintings by Nicola De Maria and Norbert Prangenberg. In addition, works by Erwin Heerich, Abraham David Christian, Zvi Goldstein, David Rabinowitch, Richard Deacon, Didier Vermeiren, Rosemarie Trockel, Jan Vercruysse and others were collected. At the end of the 1990s, the collection was supplemented by paintings by Gerhard Richter and Sigmar Polke.

Joseph Beuys 
With the Beuys Block, the Kunstmuseen Krefeld have a unique group of works consisting of seven objects that the artist arranged himself in several stages. Born in Krefeld in 1921, Beuys was very much associated with the museum. As early as 1952, he created the fountain, a commissioned work that he made - mediated by Paul Wember, the museum director at the time - for the Krefelder Edelstahlwerke. Until the last purchase in 1976, 53 further works were brought to Krefeld with the artist's help. The central object is the installation Barraque D'Dull Odde acquired in 1971, a double shelf with a lectern and seating, in which all the relics of Beuys' artistic life can be found. In February 1977, Joseph Beuys spent two days and nights dismantling the Barraque D'Dull Odde in its old location and reassembling it in a newly designed exhibition space in which the windows were covered and painted completely white. Afterwards, all the remaining Beuys works were installed in the same room together with the artist. In 1984, Beuys completed it by adding a second room. Even during the renovation of the museum between 2012 and 2016, the ensemble remained in its original place.

In 2010, this unique group of works was in danger of being torn apart when the collector Helga Lauffs withdrew her collection, which included five works by Beuys, from the museum. With the help of the state of North Rhine-Westphalia, the works of art were kept at the Kaiser Wilhelm Museum.

Graphic arts collection 

The Kunstmuseen Krefeld have an extensive Graphic Collection with over 12,000 drawings, prints and artists' books. The foundation of this collection was laid in the early years under the director Friedrich Deneken. The aim was to provide an overview of the artistic development of the 19th century with individual sheets. But the first posters were also purchased for the international poster collection, which today numbers over 1000 sheets. In 1923, the collection expanded abruptly with the acquisition of the model collection of the Deutsches Museum für Kunst in Handel und Gewerbe. At the same time, an extensive collection of Japanese woodblock prints was created. In the 1920s, prints by Heinrich Campendonk, Erich Heckel, Käthe Kollwitz and Franz Marc joined the collection. Even after the Second World War, special attention was paid to the graphic arts collection. For example, the art museums have 80 prints by Picasso as well as works by Warhol, Beuys and Matisse. In the 1980s, works by Gerhard Richter, Nicola De Maria, Abraham David Christian, Mimmo Paladino, A. R. Penck and Norbert Prangenberg were added. In the 1990s, graphic works by artists such as Christian Boltanski, Bethan Huws, Anri Sala or Luc Tuymans entered the collection.

Following the fundamental renovation of the Kaiser Wilhelm Museum in 2016, the Graphic Arts Collection has been given a permanent place. A Graphic Studies Cabinet has been set up where visitors can ask to see sheets from the rich collection.

Exhibitions 
Especially since Haus Lange has been available as an exhibition space, the Krefeld art museums have presented a whole series of highly regarded art exhibitions. In the process, Haus Lange and Haus Esters are often regarded by the artists themselves as a field for experimentation, entirely in the sense of the then director Paul Wember, who formulated: The exhibition form must become a different one, because art has become different ... We can no longer be content with hanging pictures on the wall or putting sculptures on the plinth. Thus, major exhibitions by Alberto Giacometti, Alexander Calder, ZERO, Marcel Duchamp, Robert Indiana, Claes Oldenburg, among others, can be pointed to, Timm Ulrichs, Adolf Luther, Keith Sonnier, Abraham David Christian, Thomas Schütte, Gerhard Richter, Richard Deacon, Stan Douglas or Andreas Gursky. Some artists incorporated an examination of Mies van der Rohe's buildings in a special way. The beginning was made in 1961 by Yves Klein with temporary fire columns, which he lit in the garden of the house, as well as a Raum der Leere, a retrofitted room with a floor area of seven square metres, which he whitewashed in a grainy white and which exists unchanged to this day. In 1971, Haus Lange was covered with an airborne construction by the group  for the exhibition Cover, Überleben in verschmutzter Umwelt. Christo laid out his fabric panels in the house and garden for the presentation Wrapped Floors and Wrapped Walk Ways in the same year. In 2009, for the exhibition BRICK BLDG, LG WINDOWS W/XLENT VIEWS, PARTIALLY FURNISHED, RENOWNED ARCHITECT, John Baldessari fully covered the large windows of Haus Lange outside with images of bricks.

 2017/2018: Haus Lange Exat 51 - Synthese der Künste im Jugoslawien der Nachkriegszeit.
 2017/2018: Haus Esters Jamina Cibic: Spirit of our Needs (curated by Katia Baudin).
 2020: Haus Esters Sharon Ya'ari. The Romantic Trail and the Concrete House.

References

Further reading 
 Paul Wember: Kunst in Krefeld. M. DuMont Schauberg, 1973, .

External links 

 

Modern art museums in Germany
Buildings and structures in Krefeld
1899 establishments in Germany
1890s architecture